Future Film Factory International Private Limited is an Indian film production company based in Chennai. The company was founded in 2015 by A.R.S. Sunder. The company first produced the film Dhayam starring  Santhosh Prathap in 2017.

Filmography

Production

References 

Film distributors of India
Indian companies established in 2015
Film production companies based in Chennai
Indian film studios
Mass media companies established in 2015
2015 establishments in Tamil Nadu